Mina may refer to:

Places

Iran 
 Minaq, East Azerbaijan
 Mina, Fars
 Mineh, Lorestan Province
 Mina, Razavi Khorasan
 Mehneh, Razavi Khorasan Province

United States 
 Mina, California
 Mina, Nevada
 Mina, New York
 Mina, Ohio
 Mina, South Dakota

Ports
 Al-Mina, a modern name given to an ancient coast settlement in Syria
 El Mina, Lebanon, the original site of the harbor of the Phoenician city of Tripoli

Elsewhere 
 Elmina, Ghana, a modern town which grew around the first European settlement in sub-Saharan Africa
 Mina 3, Santa Cruz Province, Argentina
 Mina, Burkina Faso, village in Balé Province, Burkina Faso
 Mina, Iloilo, a municipality in Iloilo, Philippines
 Mina, Nuevo León, a municipality in Nuevo León, Mexico
 Mina, Saudi Arabia
 Mina River (Indonesia)
 Abu Dhabi Vegetable Market or Al Mina Fruit & Vegetable Market, Abu Dhabi, United Arab Emirates

Languages
 Hina language, a language of Cameroon
 Gen language or Mina, the language of the Mina people in the southern Togo
 Mina (Louisiana), a language community in Louisiana

People
 Mina (given name), a given name (and list of people and characters with that name)
 Mina (surname), a surname (and list of people with that name)
 Mena, an alternate transliteration of Meena, a tribe in the Rajasthan and Madhya Pradesh regions of India

Entertainers
 Mina (Italian singer) (born 1940), Italian singer
 Mina (German singer) (born 1993), German pop musician
 Mina (Japanese singer) (born 1997), member of South Korean girl group Twice
 Mina (voice actress) (born 1984), Japanese voice actress
 Kang Mi-na (born 1999), South Korean singer known sometimes as “Mina”
 Shim Mina, South Korean singer performing as "Mina"

Fictional characters
 Mina (Dragonlance), a herald of the One God in Dragonlance
 Mina, a Trial Captain in Pokémon Sun and Moon and Pokémon Ultra Sun and Ultra Moon
 Mina in Karakai Jozu no Takagi-san

Music
 Mina (1964 album)
 Mina (1971 album)
 Mina (1974 album)
 Mina (drum), a Venezuelan drum

MINA
Montenegrin News Agency, Montenegrin national news agency
MINA (gene), a gene which encodes RIOX2, formerly known as MYC-induced nuclear antigen
 Apache MINA, Apache Software Multipurpose Infrastructure for Network Application

Other uses 
 Mīna, a month in the Hindu calendar
 Mina, a month in the Darian calendar
 Mina (unit), an ancient Near Eastern unit of weight and currency
 Mina (TV series), a Korean drama
 Mina (Mexico City Metrobús), a BRT station in Mexico City

See also 
Meena (disambiguation)
Mena (disambiguation)
Menas (disambiguation)
Mene (disambiguation)
Menes (fl. c. 3100 BC), Egyptian pharaoh
Minas (disambiguation)
Myna (disambiguation)